John McTaggart may refer to:

 J. M. E. McTaggart (1866–1925), idealist metaphysician
 Sir John McTaggart, 1st Baronet (1789–1867), Scottish Liberal MP in the British Parliament
 John McTaggart (jockey) (1896–1946), American Champion jockey in the sport of Thoroughbred horse racing

See also 
 John Mactaggart (disambiguation)